Veena Goel Crownholm (born September 23, 1981) is an American writer, motivational speaker, internet personality, blogger, actress, and beauty pageant titleholder from Laguna Hills, California. She was crowned Miss California 2004, placed fourth runner-up and won a preliminary talent award at Miss America 2005. In 2002, Goel graduated from UCLA with a bachelor's degree in Sociology. Since then, she has worked extensively in the non-profit industry specializing in special event fundraising and program development.

References

1981 births
Living people
Miss America 2005 delegates
Miss America Preliminary Talent winners